"A High-Toned Old Christian Woman" is a poem in Wallace Stevens's first book of poetry, Harmonium (1923).

Milton J. Bates interprets the poem as a "shocking version" of
Santayana's argument in Interpretations of Poetry and Religion (1900) that poetry and religion are equally fictions of the human mind, simply reflecting the values of the human maker.

Interpretation

In his mock-judicious, mock-pompous setting of genteel debate ("...May, merely may, madame,..."), Stevens has fun with the idea of an objective moral order possessed of religious authority, the word "nave" suggesting "knave" as in "knaves will continue to proselyte fools"; the resulting heaven is "haunted".  Just as a classical peristyle might be set in opposition to a Gothic nave, a pagan moral perspective might, "palm for palm", replace Palm-Sunday palms/psalms by squiggling-saxophone palms. The alternative to the haunted heaven is still simply a "projection", though of an allegorical masque rather than an architecture. The bawdy adherents of such an "opposing law" would not exhibit Christianity's ascetic virtues but instead—"equally"—with a "tink and tank and tunk-a-tunk-tunk", might just produce a jovial hullabaloo comparing favorably with history's construction of "haunted heaven".

Another interpretive direction is that the poem is about nihilism rather than an alternative morality of pagan virtues. Bates seems to take this direction when he writes, "If lewdness is human, why not project a heaven on this basis rather than the moral sentiment?" This seems to concede that the alternative construction wouldn't be a moral perspective, capable of sustaining its own moral sentiment, but rather a nihilistic "lewd" rejection of "the moral sentiment"—enough to make a high-toned Christian widow wince.

Notes

References
Bates, Milton J. Wallace Stevens: a mythology of self. 1985: University of California Press.

1923 poems
American poems
Poetry by Wallace Stevens